Fahrettin Altay is the western terminus of the İzmir Metro's only operating line, the M1. Located under Fahrettin Altay square, the station has two side platforms servicing two tracks. The station was opened on 26 July 2014, after 9 years of delayed construction.

The station offers connections to regional buses to Çeşme, Urla, Seferihisar and Karaburun, which depart from a terminal adjacent to Fahrettin Altay square.

History

Construction of the six station expansion of the subway line, west from Üçyol, began in 2005 with completion expected by April 2007. The contract was awarded in March and groundbreaking began on 5 July. However, due to disagreements between the İzmir Metropolitan Municipality and the company contracted with building the line, construction halted on 14 February 2006 and the contract was cancelled in November. A new contract was awarded on 23 January 2007, with completion expected 31 October 2008. However the company could not reach the deadline and the contract was cancelled on 13 August 2009. The İzmir Municipality finished the remaining works, albeit at a slow pace, and completed the extension, opening Fahrettin Altay station on 26 July 2014.

Connections
ESHOT operates city bus service on İnönü Avenue.

Station Layout

References

İzmir Metro
Railway stations opened in 2014
2014 establishments in Turkey
Railway stations in İzmir Province